Xylomimetes is a genus of moths of the family Xyloryctidae.

Species
 Xylomimetes scholastis Turner, 1916
 Xylomimetes trachyptera (Turner, 1900)

References

Xyloryctidae
Xyloryctidae genera